Ustad Rahimuddin Khan Dagar (1900–1975) was a dhrupad singer from India who was awarded Padma Bhushan in 1969 . He was the father of Rahim Fahimuddin Dagar and uncle of H. Sayeeduddin Dagar, who were trained under him.

References

Hindustani singers
1975 deaths
1900 births
Recipients of the Padma Bhushan in arts
20th-century Indian singers
Recipients of the Sangeet Natak Akademi Award